Banque Populaire V, (now renamed Spindrift 2) is an offshore-racing trimaran  which was originally run by Team Banque Populaire. It was Team Banque Populaire's fifth boat designed to set oceanic records. She was launched on 4 October 2008 in Nantes, France. She holds multiple records for sailing over set courses, as well as the record for distance sailed in 24 hours by any class of sailing boat, 908.2 nm.

With her  length, she is currently the largest racing trimaran in the world. Her current skipper is Yann Guichard. Her previous skippers are Loick Peyron and Pascal Bidégorry. Her original sponsor was the French bank Banque Populaire. Currently she is owned by Dona Bertarelli & Spindrift Racing and sponsored by Mirabaud Group,  Zenith and Genes-X.

Design 
The architectural project for Banque Populaire V started in 2006. The naval architects VPLP (Van Peteghem / Lauriot-Prévost) designed this G-Class maxi multihull. The trimaran was built by the shipyard CDK Technologies in Lorient.

Career

Launch to 2012 Banque Populaire V
She was launched at the end of August 2008 in Lorient.

In 2009 she made her first attempt across the northern Atlantic from west to east. On Sunday 2 August 2009, she established the new record in 3 days, 15 hours, 25 minutes and 48 seconds (an average speed of 32.94 knots), beating the previous record, held by Franck Cammas on Groupama 3, by more than 12 hours.

In 2010 the boat was stationed in Brest, awaiting a weather opening to beat the Jules Verne Trophy record (circumnavigation of the world), held since 2010 by Franck Cammas and the multihull Groupama 3. The first such attempt started on January 22, 2011, but she hit some debris in the Southern Atlantic and was forced to retire on February 4.

Loïck Peyron took over as skipper from Pascal Bidégorry in June 2011. A second, successful attempt began on 22 November 2011 and set a new record in 45 days, 13 hours, and 43 minutes.

2013 - Present - Spindrift 2

In January 2013, the boat was acquired by Dona Bertarelli's racing team Spindrift Racing, and renamed Spindrift 2. The original 47 m mast was shortened by 6m for Yann Guichard to manage the boat single-handedly in the 2014 Route du Rhum, in which he achieved a second place in line honours. In 2015 a new 42 m mast was procured in view of a new attempt to break the Jules Verne record with a full crew.  On 22 November 2015 it started in a direct race with IDEC Sport and finished just 2 days slower than the current JVT record. 

The first 2019 JVT attempt started well under Yann Guichard when they broke the record between Ushant and the Equator (4d 19h 57') but they had to retire in Australia with a broken rudder stock. On 3 December 2019 the next attempt started but had to be terminated the next day due to more rudder problems at high speed.

Records 
24 hours distance, 908.2 nautical miles (1682 km), an average speed of 37.84 knots  with a maximum speed of 47.16 knots during the record breaking Northern Atlantic passage of August 2009. Skippered by Pascal Bidegorry
Skippered by Pascal Bidegorry. This is just two knots slower than the fastest Blue Riband Ocean Liner  (1952, powered by 180.000 kW) and still two knots faster than second ranking  of 1938.
 Trans-Mediterranean record, between Marseille (France) and Carthage (Tunisia), 16 May 2010, in 14 hours 20 minutes and 34 seconds at an actual average speed of 33.24 knots.  Skippered by Pascal Bidegorry
 Around the British Isles record, in 3 days, 3 hours and 49 minutes, 8 July 2010. Skippered by Loick Peyron
 Fastnet Race, in 1 day, 8 hours and 48 minutes, 15 August 2011, averaging 18.5 knots. Skippered by Loick Peyron
 Jules Verne Trophy (fastest circumnavigation around the world) (Since been surpassed) in 45 days, 13 hours, 42 minutes and 53 seconds, arrival 6 January 2012, averaging 19.75 knots. Skippered by Loick Peyron

See also 
Comanche, the current record-holding monohull
IDEC Sport
Orange II
USA 17 (yacht)

References

External links

Banque Populaire V Official site
Banque Populaire V smashes transatlantic record on Youtube
Spindrift Racing

Trimarans
Individual sailing vessels
2000s sailing yachts
Sailing yachts designed by VPLP
Sailing yachts built in France
Sailing yachts of France
Route du Rhum yachts
Fastnet Race yachts